Everts may refer to:

Places
 Everts, California
 Everts Township, Minnesota
 Mount Everts, Wyoming

Other uses
 Everts (surname), including a list of people with the name
 Everts Air, airline based in Fairbanks, Alaska

See also
 Evert (disambiguation)
 Eversion (disambiguation)